Skalin may refer to
 Skalin, Gryfice County, a village in Poland
Skalin, Stargard County, a village in Poland
Skalina Point in Antarctica
Igor Skalin (born 1970), Russian Olympic sailor